OceanFirst Bank, N.A.  is an  American regional bank subsidiary of the U.S. financial services holding company OceanFirst Financial Corp founded and headquartered in Ocean County, New Jersey, with operations throughout New Jersey, and in the major metropolitan markets of Philadelphia, New York City, Baltimore, Washington D.C., and Boston.

The company offers online banking, current accounts, mobile banking, personal loans, debit cards, e-banking, mortgage loan, commercial lending, cash management, and insurance services.

History 
OceanFirst Bank traces its history back to 1902 in Point Pleasant Beach, NJ, Ocean County, where it was founded as Point Pleasant Building & Loan Association.  In 1960 the name was changed to Ocean Federal Savings and Loan establishing local operations until 1985 when business expansion took place into Middlesex County, NJ.

In 1999 the name was changed from Ocean Federal Savings & Loan Association to OceanFirst Bank.

OceanFirst completed its initial public offering (IPO) converting from mutual to stock ownership in 1996 which included establishing a holding company.  In 2018, OceanFirst  became a bank holding company, OceanFirst Financial Corp, and  the company completed the conversion of its charter from a federal savings bank to a national commercial bank.

Business expansion 
OceanFirst Financial Corp. enhanced its organic growth efforts with acquisitions beginning in 2015.  Since then, it has completed deals to acquire 6 different financial institutions in  New Jersey, Philadelphia, and New York City. First was the acquisition of Colonial American Bank on July 31, 2015. Then, in January 2016, it agreed to buy Cape Bancorp, Inc. which was a bank with 22 branches and five loans offices, for $196 million.

On November 30, 2016, OceanFirst Financial Corp. acquired, for $146 million, Ocean Shore Holding Co. including its subsidiary, Ocean City Home Bank, a community banks that dates back to 1887 in Ocean City with 11 branches in Atlantic and Cape May counties .  In 2018, it completed a  $475 million acquisition of Sun Bancorp Inc., the holding company for Sun National Bank. In January 2019, it closed a $77 million acquisition deal of Capital Bank of New Jersey;  under the deal, Capital Bank operated as a division of OceanFirst Bank until its customers and accounts were integrated into the OceanFirst operating system in the second quarter of 2019, at which time Capital Bank was rebranded as OceanFirst Bank.

On January 1, 2020, OceanFirst Financial Corp. acquired Two River Bancorp and Country Bank Holding Company, Inc. in a transaction worth approximately $183 million and $102.2 million respectively. Two River Bancorp was a full-service community bank operating 14 branch locations and 2 loan production offices in Monmouth, Ocean, Union and Essex Counties. Country Bank Holding Company Inc. was founded in 1988 and provided banking services to small businesses and individuals through its network of five Country Bank branches located in the metropolitan New York market.

On November 4, 2021, OceanFirst Financial Corp. announced a merger agreement with Partners Bancorp in a transaction worth approximately $186 million. Partners Bancorp, created by the 2019 merger of the Bank of Delmarva and the Virginia Partners Bank, has 20 branches in Maryland, Delaware, Virginia, and New Jersey. The merger is expected to close by the end of the second quarter 2022.

Sports marketing 
The first commercial naming rights for Monmouth University stadium was announced in 2016, the name of the arena was changed from Multipurpose Activity Center to OceanFirst Bank Center following a multi-year naming rights sponsorship with OceanFirst.

OceanFirst Foundation. 
In 1996, the bank  established an independent charitable foundation named OceanFederal Foundation in 1996. In 1999 it became OceanFirst Foundation. The foundation has granted more thanUS$ 45 million to non-profit organizations and schools, helping the community around the bank's market areas.

References

External links 

 Official website

Banks based in New Jersey
Banks established in 1902
Toms River, New Jersey
1902 establishments in New Jersey